The 2001–02 Pro Tour season was the seventh season of the Magic: The Gathering Pro Tour. On 18 August 2001 the season began with parallel Grand Prixs in Kobe and Denver. It ended on 18 August 2002 with the conclusion of the 2002 World Championship in Sydney. The season consisted of 33 Grand Prixs and 6 Pro Tours, held in New York, New Orleans, San Diego, Osaka, Nice, and Sydney. Also Master Series tournaments were held at four Pro Tours. At the end of the season Kai Budde was proclaimed Pro Player of the Year, winning the title by a record margin.

Grand Prixs – Kobe, Denver, Santiago, Singapore, London 

GP Kobe (18–19 August)
 Itaru Ishida
 Shuhei Nakamura
 Kei Ikeda
 Takayuki Nagaoka
 Hiroshi Kawasaki
 Ryo Ogura
 Takumi Hasegawa
 Kenshiro Ito

GP Denver (18–19 August)
 Brett Shears
 Danny Mandel
 Brock Parker
 Darwin Kastle
 Sammy Batarseh
 Mike Abraham
 Aaron Knobloch
 Alex Borteh

GP Santiago (25–26 August)
 Matias Gabrenja
 Gerardo Godinez
 Jorge Rodriguez
 Jose Echeverria
 Rodrigo Sanchez
 Brock Parker
 Andrés Hojman
 Juan Ruetter

GP Singapore (1–2 September)
 Albertus Law
 Kelvin Yew Teck Hoon
 Akuma Ding Yuen Leong
 Michihisa Onoda
 Royce Ming Huang Chai
 Lance Chin Wei Yeong
 David Kwan
 Chang Chua

GP London (1–2 September)
 Kai Budde
 Gabriel Nassif
 Helmut Summersberger
 Matt Henstra
 Warren Marsh
 René Kraft
 Antoine Ruel
 Pierre Malherbaud

Pro Tour – New York (7–9 September 2001) 

New York was the third time Pro Tour was held in the Team Limited format. Car Acrobatic Team who had been amongst the Top 4 at the previous team Pro Tour returned for another Top 4. The event was won by team Phoenix Foundation consisting of Kai Budde, Dirk Baberowski, and Marco Blume. It was Baberowski's second win and Budde's fourth. The final was also a repeat to the final of Grand Prix London a week before, where Budde had already won against Nassif. Eventually Kai's renewed success led to some memorable quotes. Asked about the favorite to win amongst the final 4 several pros exclaimed something to the extent of the words Gary Wise pronounced, "Kai doesn't lose on Sunday". Randy Buehler's comment "if he wins New Orleans, I guess he is" on the discussion whether Kai is the best player in the history of the game also became a classic when Kai indeed won PT New Orleans.

Tournament data 
Prize pool: $202,200
Players: 426 (142 teams)
Format: Invasion Team Sealed (Invasion, Planeshift, Apocalypse) – first day, Invasion Team Rochester Draft (Invasion-Planeshift-Apocalypse) – final two days
Head Judge: Collin Jackson

Top 4

Final standings 

* The team entered the tournament as "My Team Part 17", but decided they wanted to have more serious name as a Top4 team and changed it to "Illuminati".

Pro Player of the year standings

Grand Prixs – Warsaw, Minneapolis, Oslo, Vienna, Cape Town, Shizuoka, Montreal, Brisbane 

GP Warsaw (8–9 September)
 Rickard Österberg
 Michal Marcik
 David Linder
 Mattias Kettil
 Przemek Oberbek
 Marcin Sados
 Felix Schneiders
 Roman Kubera

GP Oslo (22–23 September)
 Trey Van Cleave
 Anton Jonsson
 Johan Backfjärd
 Sigurd Eskeland
 Svante Landgraf
 Rickard Österberg
 Peter Laier
 Haakon Monsen

GP Minneapolis (29–30 September)
 Dave Humpherys
 Andrew Wolf
 Brian Hegstad
 Brian Davis
 Craig Wescoe
 Cassius Weatherby
 Lee Curtis
 Jacob Janoska

GP Vienna (6–7 October)
 Stephan Meyer
 Eivind Nitter
 Nicolai Herzog
 Gabor Papp
 Matthias Künzler
 Holger Meinecke
 Konrad Zawadzki
 Ladoslav Zupancic

GP Cape Town (6–7 October)
 Ben Seck
 Wagner Kruger
 Justin Polin
 Grant van Dyk
 Andrew Mitchell
 Pieter Loubser
 Robert Thompson
 Peter Klein

GP Shizuoka (13–14 October)
 Kohei Yamadaya
 Masahiko Morita
 Ryouma Shiozu
 Olivier Ruel
 Katsuhiro Mori
 Tsuyoshi Douyama
 Reiji Ando
 Eiho Kato

GP Montreal (13–14 October)
 Mike Turian
 Louis Boileau
 Timothy McKenna
 Brett Shears
 David Rood
 Bob Maher, Jr.
 Peter Szigeti
 Daniel Clegg

GP Brisbane (20–21 October)
 Richard Johnston
 Roger Miller
 Alex Shvartsman
 Egidio De Gois
 Lenny Collins
 Dante Rosati
 Pang Ming Wee
 Daniel Romans

Pro Tour – New Orleans (2–4 November 2001) 

After winning Pro Tour New York Kai Budde won New Orleans as well, making him the only player to win back to back Pro Tours. His fifth Pro Tour victory also made him the record money-earner and erased almost all doubt, that Budde is the best player in the history of the game.

Tournament data 
Prize pool: $200,130
Players: 355
Format: Extended
Head Judge: Mike Guptil

Top 8

Final standings

Masters – Booster Draft

Pro Player of the year standings

Grand Prixs – Hong Kong, Atlanta, Biarritz, Curitiba, Las Vegas, Sendai, Houston 

GP Hong Kong (17–18 November)
 Jeff Fung
 Frederick Salazar
 Tsuyoshi Fujita
 Shinsuke Hayashi
 Bayani Manansala, Jr.
 Steven Shears
 Brian Hegstad
 Ryan Fuller

GP Atlanta (17–18 November)
 Eugene Harvey
 Andrew Johnson
 Brad Swan
 Matt Linde
 Bin Chen
 Antonino De Rosa
 Craig Wescoe
 Alex Borteh

GP Biarritz (24–25 November)
 Nicolas Labarre
 Kai Budde
 Lucio Moratinos
 Joost Vollebregt
 Ferran Vila
 Alexander Witt
 Alexis Dumay
 Olivier Ruel

GP Curitiba (8–9 December)
 Guilherme Svaldi
 Alex Shvartsman
 Antoine Ruel
 Leopoldo Martins
 Raphael Gunther
 Jose Barbero
 José Mangueira
 Eliton Enacio

GP Las Vegas (8–9 December)
 Michael Pustilnik
 Adam Lane
 John Balla
 Sean Fitzgerald
 Kaare Anderson
 Rob Dougherty
 Shannon Krumick
 Scott Gerhardt

GP Sendai (15–16 December)
 Kazuaki Arahori
 Kazuya Hirabayashi
 Mike Long
 Yuki Murakami
 Itaru Ishida
 Kazufumi Abe
 Jin Okamoto
 Katsuhiro Mori

GP Houston (5–6 January)
 Joshua Smith
 Brian Kibler
 William Jensen
 Ben Rubin
 Bob Maher, Jr.
 Alex Shvartsman
 Jonathan Pechon
 Jonathan Job

Pro Tour – San Diego (11–13 January 2002) 

The 2002 was won by the French Farid Meraghni. It was the first time a French player won a major tournament after several French players coming in second at Worlds and Pro Tours. Also the tournament is known for Magic veteran Eric Taylor literally eating his hat due to losing a bet about Kai Budde winning Pro Tour New Orleans. Canadian player Ryan Fuller won the Masters.

Tournament data 

Players: 348
Prize Pool: $200,130
Format: Odyssey Rochester Draft (Odyssey)
Head Judge: Mike Donais

Top 8

Final standings

Masters – Standard

Pro Player of the year standings

Grand Prixs – Lisbon, Heidelberg, Fukuoka, Tampa, Antwerp 

GP Lisbon (19–20 January)
 Kai Budde
 Patrick Mello
 Olivier Ruel
 Marcio Carvalho
 Stefano Fiore
 Alex Shvartsman
 Tom Van de Logt
 Jelger Wiegersma

GP Heidelberg (9–10 February)
 Kamiel Cornelissen
 Chris Benafel
 Franck Canu
 Thomas Preyer
 Jelger Wiegersma
 Patrick Mello
 Yuri Kolomeyko
 Joost Vollebregt

GP Fukuoka (16–17 February)
 Alex Shvartsman
 Masahiko Morita
 Itaru Ishida
 Jun Ishihara
 Masahiro Kuroda
 Tsuyoshi Fujita
 Yusuke Sasaki
 Shuhei Nakamura

GP Tampa (23–24 February)
 Sol Malka
 Jeff Cunningham
 Koby Kennison
 Mike Emmert
 Antonino De Rosa
 Brian Kibler
 Adam Racht
 Adam Prokopin

GP Antwerp (2–3 March)
 Kai Budde
 Florent Jeudon
 Matthias Jorstedt
 Wolfgang Eder
 Arjan van Leeuwen
 Christoph Lippert
 Jan Schreurs
 Dirk Baberowski

Pro Tour – Osaka (15–17 March 2002)

Tournament data 

Players: 277
Prize Pool: $200,130
Format: Odyssey Block Constructed (Odyssey, Torment)
Head Judge: Collin Jackson

Top 8

Final standings

Masters – Team Rochester Draft

Pro Player of the year standings

Grand Prixs – Barcelona, Kuala Lumpur, Naples 

GP Barcelona (23–24 March)
 Noah Boeken
 Christoph Lippert
 Olivier Ruel
 Carlos Barrado
 Stan van der Velden
 Reinhard Blech
 Raphaël Lévy
 Franck Canu

GP Kuala Lumpur (30–31 March)
 Ding Yueng Leong
 Chang Chua
 Yujian Zhou
 Veerapat Sirilertvorakul
 Alex Shvartsman
 Nicholas Jonatha Wong
 Tobey Tamber
 Edsel Alvarez

GP Naples (6–7 April)
 Pierre Malherbaud
 Jelger Wiegersma
 Kai Budde
 Olivier Ruel
 Patrick Mello
 Iwan Tan
 Raphaël Lévy
 Christoph Lippert

Pro Tour – Nice (3–5 May 2002) 

In Nice Kai Budde lost his first match on a Pro Tour Sunday, after winning his previous five Top 8. His third final day appearance and ensuing 36-point-lead virtually secured him the Pro Player of the Year title, though. The Pro Tour was won by Norwegian Eivind Nitter, while the Masters Series title went to Alexander Witt from the Netherlands.

Tournament data 

Players: 332
Prize Pool: $200,130
Format: Odyssey Block Booster Draft (Odyssey-Torment)
Head Judge: Cyril Grillon

Top 8

Final standings

Masters – Extended

Pro Player of the year standings

Grand Prixs – Nagoya, Milwaukee, New Jersey, Sao Paulo, Taipei 

GP Nagoya (11–12 May)
1. P.S.2
 Masahiro Kuroda
 Katsuhiro Mori
 Masahiko Morita
2. S.S.D.
 Naoki Kubouchi
 Shuhei Nakamura
 Kimio Imai
3. NAGOYAN
 Ryo Ogura
 Ryoma Shiozu
 Koji Nose
4. N.G.O.K.
 Takayuki Nagaoka
 Tsuyoshi Fujita
 Masayuki Higashino

GP Milwaukee (11–12 May)
 Eric Taylor
 Patrick Chapin
 Mike Turian
 Neil Reeves
 David Petersen
 Brian Kibler
 William Jensen
 Steve Cassell

GP New Jersey (29–30 June)
1. The Jokas
 Eric James
 Kyle Rose
 Norman Woods
2. Illuminati
 Justin Gary
 Zvi Mowshowitz
 Alex Shvartsman
3. Team Cardshark
 Jason Huang
 Paul Sottosanti
 Adam Fischer
4. Lovespell
 Alex Borteh
 Chris Benafel
 Eric Froehlich

GP São Paulo (13–14 July)
 Gabriel Caligaris
 Felipe Desiderati
 Antoine Ruel
 Luis Sérgio Massaro
 Raphael Fontana Günter
 André Barreto
 Michel Shirozono
 Rodrigo Castro

GP Taipei (13–14 July)
 Sheng Hsun Hsia
 Kang Nien Chiang
 Joe Yi Xiang Wang
 Albertus Law
 Morris Song
 Wen-Jien Hwang
 Chang Ming Tung
 Lucifar Sun

2002 World Championships – Sydney (14–18 August 2002) 

As Jens Thorén had not scored any points since Nice and he was not on his national team the Pro Tour Player of the Year going to Kai Budde was already a sure thing before the tournament. While Carlos Romão from Brazil became World Champion by defeating Mark Ziegner from Germany in the final, the German team also starring Mark Ziegner won the team competition.

Tournament data 
Prize pool: $210,200 (individual) + $162,000 (national teams)
Players: 245
Formats: Standard, Odyssey Booster Draft (Odyssey-Torment-Judgment), Odyssey Block Constructed (Odyssey, Torment, Judgment)
Head Judge: Collin Jackson

Top 8

Final standings

National team competition 

  Germany (Mark Ziegner, Kai Budde, Felix Schneiders)
  United States (Andrew Ranks, Eugene Harvey, Eric Franz)

Pro Player of the year final standings 

After the World Championship Kai Budde was awarded the Pro Player of the year title. He thus became the only player to win the title more than once. Budde's 117 Pro Points in this season to date is still the only time that a player garnered more than 100 Pro Points in a season, and his lead of 42 Pro Points over the second place is still the greatest ever achieved at the end of a season.

References 

Magic: The Gathering professional events